Okoman Radio is a private radio station in the Eastern Region of Ghana. The radio station is located in Akropong, the capital of the Akuapim North District, a district in the Eastern Region. It was established in May 2021 and It covers local news, politics, business, entertainment and other issues in Ghana

References

External links 

 

Radio stations in Ghana
Eastern Region (Ghana)
Mass media in Accra